John William Stanton (February 20, 1924 – April 11, 2002) was an American politician who served as a Republican U.S. Representative from Ohio from 1965 to 1983.

Biography
Stanton was born in Painesville, Ohio. His father, Francis Michael Stanton, was a World War I veteran who lived for many years in Cleveland, Ohio in the house next door to Jerry Siegal, the creator of Superman. Stanton's mother, Mary Callinan Stanton, was the daughter of Delia Sexton Callinan, an Irish immigrant, who worked as an upstairs maid in the wealthy suburb of Bratenahl. His grandfather on his mother's side was Matthew Callinan, a streetcar conductor, who died on November 16, 1895, in what was then the largest transportation accident in American history, when the streetcar he was riding on plunged over an open viaduct into the river. Stanton was one of six children, four of whom died before the age of 21. Stanton was an Eagle Scout, and was awarded the Distinguished Eagle Scout Award by the National Eagle Scout Association in March 2002. He graduated from Culver Military Academy in 1942. He received his draft notice on Thanksgiving Day in 1942 and spent the following four years in Hawaii, New Guinea, and the Philippines with the 33rd Infantry Division Reconnaissance Troop. He received the Bronze Star and the Purple Heart. He briefly considered attending the School of Foreign Service at Georgetown University but the line was too long, so he switched to business administration. In 1949, Stanton graduated from Georgetown University, having also been president of the senior class for that year.

Stanton was a businessman by profession. After college, he followed in his father's footsteps and opened his own Lincoln-Mercury dealership in Painesville, where one of his salespeople was Don Shula, who later became coach of the Miami Dolphins football team. The business grew into one of the largest Ford Motor Co. franchises. He decided to run for county commissioner after county-wide regulations prohibited a plant that was planning on locating in Painesville, Ohio to relocate in Lorain, Ohio. He was elected Lake County commissioner in 1956 and 1960.

Stanton often said he chose to be a Republican because it was the party of Abraham Lincoln, but he considered himself socially liberal and fiscally conservative. His New York Times obituary noted he was a friend to both business leaders and labor organizations. He was elected as a Republican to the 89th to 97th Congresses, (January 3, 1965 - January 3, 1983). He did not seek election to the 98th United States Congress, and later served as an executive at the World Bank. He died in Jacksonville, Florida on April 11, 2002. Stanton is, to date, the last Republican to represent Ohio's 11th district in Congress.

References

Obituary http://articles.chicagotribune.com/2002-04-15/news/0204150105_1_world-bank-mr-stanton-ohio-republican

1924 births
2002 deaths
People from Painesville, Ohio
Georgetown University alumni
United States Army personnel of World War II
United States Army soldiers
20th-century American politicians
Culver Academies alumni
Republican Party members of the United States House of Representatives from Ohio